Fastsigns International Inc. (stylized as FASTSIGNS) is the franchisor of Fastsigns centers which provide custom sign and graphics products.

There are currently over 700 Fastsigns locations worldwide in United States, Canada, the U.K., the Cayman Islands, Mexico, Saudi Arabia, the UAE, Chile and Australia (where centers operate under the name Signwave). Countries where the company formerly had locations but no longer operates include Brazil (from which it withdrew in 1996) and Argentina.

History

FASTSIGNS was founded in Austin in 1985 by Gary Salomon and Bob Schanbaum. The first franchise was sold in December 1986, with its first international franchise sold in 1991. The company was bought in October 2003 by Roark Capital Group, an Atlanta-based private equity firm.  In 2009, former president of PIP Printing, Catherine Monson, was named CEO of Fastsigns. In July 2014, Fastsigns was acquired by Levine Leichtman Capital Partners, a Beverly Hills-based investment firm.

The creation and growth of Fastsigns was profiled in a case study in the textbook Managing: A Competency-Based Approach.

References

External links
 

American companies established in 1985
Business services companies established in 1985
Franchises
Business services companies of the United States
Companies based in Carrollton, Texas
Private equity portfolio companies